Cocapata is a locality in the Cochabamba Department in central Bolivia. It is the seat of the Cocapata Municipality, the third municipal section of the Ayopaya Province. At the time of 2012 census, it had a population of 401.

References

Populated places in Cochabamba Department